The Globe Aircraft Corporation was an American aircraft manufacturer formed in 1940 in Fort Worth, Texas. It was declared bankrupt in 1947.

History
The Bennett Aircraft Corporation was originally formed on 5 April 1940 to develop aircraft using a Bakelite bonded plywood Duraloid. The company's first design was the BTC-1 twin engined monoplane. The company was renamed the Globe Aircraft Corporation in 1941 and they produced a single-engined Continental A-80 powered Globe GC-1 Swift.

With the start of the war the company abandoned plans to produce the aircraft as it concentrated on sub-contract building of 600 Beech AT-10s and components for other aircraft like the Curtiss C-46.

When wartime restrictions were removed the company developed a re-designed and all-metal version of the GC-1 designated the GC-1A Swift which first flew in 1945. The production of the Swift was sub-contracted to the Texas Engineering and Manufacturing Company (TEMCO). In July 1947 the company was declared bankrupt; the assets and design rights of the Swift were bought by TEMCO.

Aircraft

References

Notes

Bibliography

External links

 Bennett Aircraft Corporation Search Results – The Portal to Texas History
 Globe Aircraft Corporation Search Results – TCU Digital Repository

Defunct aircraft manufacturers of the United States